The Ravenscar Group is a Jurassic lithostratigraphic group (a sequence of rock strata) which occurs within the Cleveland Basin of North Yorkshire and extends to both the Hambleton and Howardian Hills. The name is derived from Ravenscar on the North Yorkshire coast where rocks of this age occur. It was earlier known as the 'Middle Jurassic Series'. It is the stratigraphic equivalent to the Inferior Oolite Group and most of the Great Oolite Group, being overlain by the Cornbrash Formation of the latter unit.

References 

Geological groups of the United Kingdom
Geologic formations of England
Aalenian Stage
Bajocian Stage
Bathonian Stage
Geology of North Yorkshire